Let the People Sing may refer to:

 Let the People Sing (novel), a 1939 novel by J.B. Priestley
 Let the People Sing (film), a 1942 British film adaptation of the novel directed by John Baxter
 Let the People Sing (contest), a choral contest organized by the BBC in the 1960s and 1970s
 Let the Peoples Sing, contest
 Let the People Sing (album), an album by The Wolfe Tones 1972
 "Let the People Sing" (song), a song by Brian Warfield of The Wolfe Tones